For Love or Money is a 1920 American silent drama film directed by Burton L. King and starring Virginia Lee, Harry Benham and L. Rogers Lytton.

Cast
 Virginia Lee as Antoinette Gerard
 Harry Benham as John T. Hamilton
 L. Rogers Lytton as Benson Churchill 
 Stephen Grattan as Oliver Gerard
 Julia Swayne Gordon as Helen Gerard
 Mildred Wayne as Sue Dennison
 Hugh Huntley as Bob Gerard

References

Bibliography
 Munden, Kenneth White. The American Film Institute Catalog of Motion Pictures Produced in the United States, Part 1. University of California Press, 1997.

External links
 

1920 films
1920 drama films
1920s English-language films
American silent feature films
Silent American drama films
American black-and-white films
Films directed by Burton L. King
1920s American films